Raiagar is a small hamlet and market at the intersection of NH 309A and Almora-Didihat Highway.  The hamlet is situated under the administrative limits of Berinag nagar panchayat in Pithoragarh district in the state of Uttarakhand, India, at a distance of approx 6 km from Berinag market.

Raiagar received attention when abandoned Iron mines were discovered here by British captain H. Drummond, who visited Raiagar in 1838.

References

Villages in Pithoragarh district